Carl Panzram: The Spirit of Hatred and Vengeance is a documentary film by John Borowski about the life and death of serial killer Carl Panzram. It is Borowski's third film.

Synopsis 
A lifelong criminal and serial killer, Carl Panzram befriends Henry Lesser, a young jail guard at the Washington, D.C. jail in 1928. After hearing of Panzram's tortured upbringing, Lesser sends Panzram one dollar and convinces the killer to write his autobiography while secretly supplying him with pencil and paper. Panzram writes over 40,000 words documenting his entire life of incarceration, torture, rape, and murder.

The film includes footage of Panzram's handwritten papers, Leavenworth Penitentiary, the Clinton Correctional Facility, the Minnesota Correctional Facility – Red Wing, and an exclusive interview with Panzram's jail guard, Henry Lesser.

John DiMaggio provides the voice of Carl Panzram.

Awards 
2012 Director's Choice Award - Chicago Horror Film Festival

References

External links
 
 
Press
 Leavenworth Times 
 Dekalb Northern Star
 Horror News
 Serial Killer Central

2011 films
2010s biographical films
2011 documentary films
American documentary films
Biographical films about serial killers
Documentary films about capital punishment in the United States
Documentary films about serial killers
Films set in the 1920s
Films set in 1928
Films set in prison
Films set in Washington, D.C.
Cultural depictions of American men
Cultural depictions of male serial killers
Cultural depictions of rapists
Cultural depictions of robbers
2010s English-language films
2010s American films